The 2nd constituency of Indre-et-Loire is one of five French legislative constituencies in the Indre-et-Loire département.

It consists of the following cantons;
Amboise, Bléré, Château-Renault, Montlouis-sur-Loire, Tours Nord-Est, Vouvray.

Deputies

Election Results

2022

2017

2012

References

2